Çağkan Çakır (born 28 January 1995), is a Turkish footballer who plays as a midfielder, most recently for İnegölspor.

Career statistics

Club

Notes

References

External links
Çağkan Çakir at TFF

1995 births
Living people
Turkish footballers
Turkish expatriate footballers
Association football midfielders
Moldovan Super Liga players
TFF Second League players
FC Zimbru Chișinău players
İnegölspor footballers
Expatriate footballers in Moldova
Turkish expatriate sportspeople in Moldova